Divyeshwari (1875–1933) was the Queen Consort of Nepal from her marriage in 1886 to her husband's death in 1911. She was the second wife of King Prithvi of Nepal. Queen Divyeshwari was the mother of King Tribhuvan of Nepal.

Other anglicized names include Divyeshwari Lakshmi Devi Shah, Lakshmi Divyeshwari, and Queen Laxmi Divyeshwari.

Queen Divyeshwari was originally a Rajput princess from Kangra, Punjab. She was married to King Prithvi in 1886 at the Narayanhity Royal Palace. She was a queen consort until 1911, when her husband died. Her son, Crown Prince Tribhuvan, then ascended the throne. Also she had a daughter, Princess Suman Rajya Lakshmi Devi (1908-1968).

Queen Divyeshwari died in 1933 at the Narayanhiti Royal Palace.

References

1875 births
1933 deaths
Nepalese queens consort
19th-century Nepalese nobility
20th-century Nepalese nobility
Nepalese Hindus